VF2590 is a radio station which broadcasts a community radio format at 92.5 FM in Revelstoke, British Columbia, Canada. The station is branded as Stoke FM/Big Mountain Radio.

History
On October 26, 2011, Stoke FM Radio Society received approval from the Canadian Radio-television and Telecommunications Commission (CRTC) to operate a new low-power developmental community FM radio station at Revelstoke with an effective radiated power with just 4 watts. In 2016, the station received approval to convert its license from the developmental radio class to a regular full-time radio station.

References

External links
Stoke FM/Big Mountain Radio
VF2590-FM history - Canadian Communication Foundation

Radio stations in British Columbia
Community radio stations in Canada
Revelstoke, British Columbia
Year of establishment missing